Herzog Heine Geduld was a leading market maker in NASDAQ and OTC securities. It was founded in 1926.  The firm was acquired by Merrill Lynch in 2000 for $968 million.

History

Founding and early history

The firm of Parmer, Herzog & Chadwick was established by Robert I. Herzog in 1926 as a bond trading and brokerage company. The company suffered severe losses in the stock market crash of 1929 but stayed in business by trading in foreign bonds. Over the years, the firm evolved into Herzog Heine Geduld Inc., becoming a member of the New York Stock Exchange.

Acquisition by Merrill Lynch

By 2000, the Nasdaq market, fueled by the Tech Bubble was booming and Herzog was the third largest market maker, with an eight percent market share.

After buying Herzog, Merrill increased its Nasdaq market-making from 650 stocks to 10,000, many of them not popular enough to be listed on the main Nasdaq market. It began trading thousands of smaller companies on Nasdaq's OTC Bulletin Board or via the Pink Sheets.

Noted alumni
John E. Herzog, founder of the Museum of American Finance

See also
Museum of American Finance

References

Former investment banks of the United States